St. Ludger's Abbey was a former monastery of the Benedictine Order in Helmstedt, Lower Saxony, founded by Saint Ludger around 800. Until it was secularised in 1802 it was an Imperial Abbey, with sovereignty over the whole town of Helmstedt until the 15th century.

History 

Shortly before 800 the missionary Ludger entered the area of Helmstedt with Charlemagne in order to convert the Saxons. Ludger founded the monastery on an ancient road, the Reichsstrasse, on the site of an ancient German shrine by a holy spring. The monastery's position on this important trade route was extremely advantageous in the Middle Ages, as great financial benefits derived from the constant passage of traders.

The significance of the monastery for Helmstedt is reflected in the town's arms, which depict Saint Ludger.
The monastery premises were rebuilt after the Thirty Years' War in the Baroque style; the ornamental monastery gateway (the so-called Turks' Gate) and the dovecote were added in the 18th century. The monastery was secularised during the Napoleonic Wars, in 1802, and the possession of the site passed to the Dukes of Brunswick-Wolfenbüttel, after which it was managed as an agricultural estate.
The buildings, including the monastery church, suffered severe damage during World War II, but have been restored. There has been a Catholic school here from at least the 18th century and there has been a kindergarten for several decades.

St. Ludger's was a sister house of Werden Abbey (incorporated into Essen in 1923). The monasteries were managed in tandem, as reflected in the arms of both houses, each of which bears twin abbots' staffs.

Gallery

External links 
  Helmstedt City Website: St. Ludger's Church
  Helmstedt City Website: Turks' Gate
 Helmstedt in the Lonely Planet World Guide

Imperial abbeys disestablished in 1802–03
Benedictine monasteries in Germany
Monasteries in Lower Saxony
Double chapels